Öjendorfer See is a lake in Billstedt (Öjendorf), Hamburg, Germany. Its surface area is 460,000 m².

External links 
 

Lakes of Hamburg
LOjendorferSee